Qiasabad or Qeyasabad or Qiyasabad or Gheysabad or Gheyasabad or Ghiasabad or Ghiyas Abad or Ghiyasabad may refer to:
 Ghiasabad, Fasa, Fars Province
 Ghiasabad, Kharameh, Fars Province
 Ghiasabad, Marvdasht, Fars Province
 Ghiasabad, Kashan, Isfahan Province
 Ghiasabad, Kermanshah
 Ghiasabad, Kurdistan
 Ghiasabad, Markazi
 Qiasabad, Razavi Khorasan
 Qiasabad-e Olya, Razavi Khorasan Province
 Ghiasabad, Yazd